Richard Nicholas Shorter (26 July 1906 – 20 January 1984) was an English cricketer.  Shorter was a left-handed batsman who bowled right-arm medium pace.  He was born at Loughton, Essex, and was educated at Repton School.

Shorter made his first-class debut for Essex against Nottinghamshire at Trent Bridge in the 1926 County Championship.  He made 22 further first-class appearances for the county, the last of which came against Cambridge University in 1929.  In his 23 first-class appearances, Shorter scored 108 runs at an average of 6.00, with a high score of 21.  With the ball, he took 15 wickets at a bowling average of 46.33, with best figures of 3/14.

He died at Drogheda, County Louth, Ireland, on 20 January 1984.

References

External links

1906 births
1984 deaths
People from Loughton
People educated at Repton School
English cricketers
Essex cricketers